The street scenes are a work of art by the artists Ernst Ludwig Kirchner made between 1913 and 1915. They are dubbed to be one of the most important works of German expressionism. It consists of eleven paintings, 32 pages from sketchbooks, 15 ink brush drawings, 17 pastel and chalk drawings, 14 woodcuts, 14 etchings and 8 lithographies. The work deals with the Berlin of the early 20th century and how it is developing into a metropolis. A lot of "Koketten" (prostitutes) are depicted as a metaphor for the hectic pace and sensuality of the growing city. There are also a lot of references to be found in the cycle.

Paintings
The paintings are the central part of the work of art. The first painting is "Five women on the street". The dynamic in the composition increased during the period of origin. Style elements of futurism but also elements of Mannerism can also be found. The paintings were mostly finished in 1914. Some of them were finished in 1915 and others in the 1920s.

Graphics

Literature
 Donald E. Gordon: Ernst Ludwig Kirchner. Kritisches Werkverzeichnis, München 1968
 Magdalene M. Moeller: Ernst Ludwig Kirchner. Die Straßenszenen 1913-1915. Hirmer Verlag, München 1993, 
 Ernst Ludwig Kirchner: Briefwechsel : 1910 - 1935. 1938, Belser Verlag, Stuttgart Zürich, 1990
 Ausstellungskatalog Ernst Ludwig Kirchner 1880–1938, Nationalgalerie Berlin, Haus der Kunst München, Museum Ludwig in der Kunsthalle Köln, Kunsthaus Zürich, 1979/1980

References

Expressionist works
Ernst Ludwig Kirchner